Ben Allal, Algeria is a town in northern Algeria.

Communes of Aïn Defla Province
Aïn Defla Province